Christ Church is in the village of Barnston, near Heswall, Wirral, Merseyside, England.  The church was built in 1870–71, and designed by G. E. Street.  It is an active Anglican parish church in the diocese of Chester.  The church is recorded in the National Heritage List for England as a designated Grade II listed building.

History

The church was built in 1870–71, and was designed by G. E. Street.  A west vestry was added later.

Architecture

Christ Church is constructed in rock-faced stone with ashlar dressings, and has a tiled roof.  Its plan consists of a nave, a chancel, a northwest porch, and north and west vestries.  At the west end there are buttresses that rise to terminate in an octagonal bell-turret.  The windows are cusped lancets, those in the nave have varying designs. The east window has three lights and contains Geometrical tracery.  Inside the church is a 20th-century octagonal font, a pulpit with traceried panels, and a timber screen on a stone base with a trefoil frieze and Tudor roses.  The choir stalls have large fleur-de-lys poppyheads.  The stained glass includes windows by Powells and by Clayton and Bell.

Appraisal

The church was designated as a Grade II listed building on 2 December 1986.  Grade II is the lowest of the three grades of listing and is applied to buildings that are "nationally important and of special interest".

Present day

Christ Church is an active Anglican parish church in the deanery of Wirral, North, the archdeaconry of Chester, and the diocese of Chester.  Its benefice is combined with that of St Michael and All Angels, Pensby.  Its style of worship is Conservative Evangelical, and its patron is the Bishop of Chester.

See also

Listed buildings in Heswall

References

Churches in the Metropolitan Borough of Wirral
Church of England church buildings in Merseyside
Grade II listed churches in Merseyside
Gothic Revival architecture in Merseyside
Diocese of Chester
Churches completed in 1871
G. E. Street buildings
Gothic Revival church buildings in England
Barnston